Primula fragrans, synonym Dodecatheon redolens, has the common name scented shooting star. It is a species of flowering plant in the primrose family.

Description
Primula fragrans is a hairy, thick-rooted perennial with long, clumping leaves around the base.

It erects slim, tall, hairy stems which are dark in color and are topped with inflorescences of 5 to 10 showy flowers. Each flower nods with its mouth pointed to the ground when new, and becomes more erect with age. It has five reflexed sepals in shades of pink, lavender, or white which lie back against the body of the flower. Each sepal base has a blotch of bright yellow and is folded into a thick lip around the mouth of the flower. From the corolla mouth protrude large anthers which may be light pink to nearly black surrounding a threadlike stigma.

Distribution
This wildflower is native from California through Nevada to western Utah. It grows in moist areas, especially in the Sierra Nevada and eastern Transverse Ranges.

References

External links
CalFlora Database: Primula fragrans (Scented shooting star)
Jepson Manual eFlora (TJM2) treatment of Primula fragrans
USDA Plants Profile for Dodecatheon redolens
UC Photos gallery — Primula fragrans

fragrans
Flora of California
Flora of Nevada
Flora of Utah
Flora of the California desert regions
Flora of the Great Basin
Flora of the Sierra Nevada (United States)
Natural history of the Transverse Ranges
Flora without expected TNC conservation status